Karl Kaufmann (born 1843 in Neuplachowitz, Austrian Silesia; † 27. April 1905 in Vienna) was an Austrian landscape and architectural painter.

Life 
Karl Kaufmann was a student at the Vienna Academy. His studies in the European North (Norway), to Holland, Germany (Franconia, Danzig, Königsberg) and often to Italy (Naples, Rome, Venice) gave him the motives for his numerous landscapes, including a remarkable number of views of Venice. 

From 1900 Karl Kaufmann constantly lived in Vienna. He often signed his works using pseudonyms. Among various other names, Byon, H. Carnier, W. Carnier, F. Gilbert, O. Halm, C.Charpentier, J. Holmstedt, Charles Marchand, R. Merkner, B. Lambert, E. Leutner, M. Heger, Hobart, L. van Howe / van Hove, R. Jäger, Laarsen, Lundberg, F. Marchant, J. Marchant, C. Poul, F. Rodek, J. Rollin, Taupiac, L. Voigt or R. Benda, have often been used.

Today the majority of Karl Kaufmann's paintings is privately owned. 
Some of his paintings have been sold in art auctions for considerable prices (32,450 GBP).

References

External links 
 Wikimedia Commons – Karl Kaufmann Gallery 

Austrian landscape painters
Austrian male painters
1843 births
1905 deaths
People from Austrian Silesia